The following are links to international rankings of the United Arab Emirates.

General rankings

Other

International rankings

References

United Arab Emirates